Evolve Mixed Martial Arts is a chain of martial arts academies. Founded by Chatri Sityodtong, it opened in January 2009. The gym includes several former and reigning UFC and ONE Championship champions, including Demetrious Johnson, Rafael Dos Anjos, Shinya Aoki, Angela Lee, Marcus Almeida and more, on its roster.

Overview
According to Yahoo! Sports Singapore, Evolve MMA has the largest roster of world champions across multiple martial arts sports. It has world champions in Muay Thai, Brazilian jiu-jitsu, Mixed Martial Arts, Boxing, Wrestling and No-Gi Grappling among others.

There are currently four Evolve MMA academies: Evolve Far East Square, Evolve Orchard Central, Evolve KINEX, and Evolve Clarke Quay in Singapore. There is also Evolve University, the largest online university for martial arts. Evolve MMA is affiliated to Sityodtong Muay Thai. Chatri Sityodtong has stated that he wants to open an Evolve MMA camp in every major Asian city.

Evolve Fight Team 
Several prominent fighters coach, train and/or represent the Evolve Fight Team in major organisations such as the Ultimate Fighting Championship and ONE Championship.

 ONE Bantamweight World Champion Fabrício Andrade
 Former UFC Flyweight World Champion and current ONE Flyweight World Champion Demetrious Johnson
 Former UFC Lightweight World Champion Rafael Dos Anjos
 Former ONE Lightweight World Champion Shinya Aoki
 ONE Women's Atomweight World Champion Angela Lee
 ONE Women's Strawweight World Champion Xiong Jing Nan
 ONE Bantamweight Muay Thai World Champion Nong-O Gaiyanghadao (2015-2022)
 Former ONE Light Heavyweight World Champion Roger Gracie
 ONE Lightweight and Welterweight World Champion Christian Lee
 Former ONE Bantamweight Kickboxing World Champion Hiroki Akimoto
 Marcus Almeida
 Mikey Musumeci
 Garry Tonon
 Sage Northcutt
 Panpayak Jitmuangnon
 Rodlek P.K. Saenchaimuaythaigym
 Ritu Phogat

See also
List of Top Professional MMA Training Camps

References

External links

Mixed martial arts training facilities
2008 establishments in Singapore
Brazilian jiu-jitsu training facilities